Wendy Larner is a New Zealand social scientist who has focussed on the interdisciplinary areas of globalisation, governance and gender. She is currently Provost at Victoria University, Wellington, New Zealand. From the 1st of September 2023, she will be Vice-Chancellor and President of Cardiff University.

In July 2018 she became the President of the Royal Society Te Apārangi, taking over from Richard Bedford.

Recognition 
Larner is an Honorary Fellow of the Royal Society Te Apārangi, a Fellow of the Academy of Social Sciences (United Kingdom) and a Fellow of the New Zealand Geographical Society. She has been a visiting fellow at universities in Germany, the United States and the United Kingdom. She was awarded the Victoria Medal in 2018 by the Royal Geographical Society.  In 2018, Larner was awarded the Innovation and Science award of the Women of Influence awards.

Larner was previously Professor of Human Geography and Sociology at the University of Bristol.

In 2017, Larner was selected as one of the Royal Society Te Apārangi's "150 women in 150 words", celebrating the contributions of women to knowledge in New Zealand.

Selected publications

References 

New Zealand geographers
Academic staff of the Victoria University of Wellington
Academics of the University of Bristol
Fellows of the Royal Society of New Zealand
Fellows of the Academy of Social Sciences
Living people
Year of birth missing (living people)
Women geographers
Victoria Medal recipients

New Zealand Women of Influence Award recipients
Presidents of the Royal Society of New Zealand